Merck KGaA v. Integra Lifesciences I, Ltd., 545 U.S. 193 (2005), is a United States Supreme Court case with ramifications for patent law. The dispute dates to approximately 1996 and centers on a federal law known as the "FDA safe harbor" (§ 271(e)(1)).

While the Court refused to "quibble" with the Court of Appeals over its conclusion that the exemption “does not globally embrace all experimental activity that at some point, however attenuated, may lead to an FDA approval process,” the Court held that:
Basic scientific research on a particular compound, performed without the intent to develop a particular drug or a reasonable belief that the compound will cause the sort of physiological effect the researcher intends to induce, is surely not “reasonably related to the development and submission of information” to the FDA. It does not follow from this, however, that §271(e)(1)’s exemption from infringement categorically excludes either (1) experimentation on drugs that are not ultimately the subject of an FDA submission or (2) use of patented compounds in experiments that are not ultimately submitted to the FDA. Under certain conditions, we think the exemption is sufficiently broad to protect the use of patented compounds in both situations.

See also 
 United States patent law

References 

 Kintisch, E. (2005, April 8). Case probes what's fair game in the search for new drugs. In Science, 308, 174.
 Mamudi, Sam, Supreme Court broadens research exemption, Managing Intellectual Property, June 14, 2005

External links
 
 Trendspotting: a shift in intellectual property focus. In Nature Bioentrepreneur

United States patent case law
Biotechnology law
United States Supreme Court cases
United States Supreme Court cases of the Rehnquist Court
2005 in United States case law
Merck Group